Miguel Yoldi Beroiz (April 14, 1903 – August 13, 1961) was a Navarrese anarcho-syndicalist.

Biography 
On April 14, 1903, Miguel Yoldi Beroiz was born in Pamplona. He was educated at the House of Mercy in Pamplona and later worked as a turner, sailor and teacher. In 1920, at the age of 17, he joined the National Confederation of Labor (CNT).

During the Dictatorship of Primo de Rivera he went into exile in France, from where he returned when the Second Republic was proclaimed (1931). He then opened a bookshop with the aim of disseminating anarchist literature, a task to which he devoted himself until in 1934 he was elected General Secretary of the CNT, replacing Joaquín Ascaso Budria and moved to Barcelona. He held the position until the Congress of Zaragoza in 1936, where he was replaced by Horacio Martínez Prieto.

When the Spanish Civil War broke out, Yoldi was elected Secretary of Defense of Catalonia and faced the military uprising in the streets of Barcelona on July 19, 1936. He later joined the Aragon Offensive as a member of the Durruti Column, with which later he went to the  defense of Madrid as an assistant of Buenaventura Durruti himself. He was wounded in the fighting in the University City of Madrid, where Durruti died. In December 1937 he returned to the Aragon front, where he replaced Enric Pérez i Farràs as head of the militia of the 24th Division of the XII Army of the Republic, together with José Manzana Vivó. After the fall of the Aragonese front in the spring of 1938, he was arrested by Republican authorities and his command of the division was withdrawn. From then until the end of the war he was a member of the Selection Board of the Military Academy.

At the end of the war he went into exile with his family, settling first in France and later in Mexico, where he formed the group of CNT leaders that decided to collaborate with the Spanish Republican government in exile. In 1945 he became an adviser to Horacio Martínez Prieto, while he was minister of the José Giral government, and from 1947 until his death he held various positions in the CNT in exile.

Works 
  Controversial polemics  (1946)

References

External links 
 Miguel Yoldi at the Basque Encyclopedia Auñamendi
 Miguel Yoldi Beroiz  to anarcoefemerides.

People from Pamplona
Spanish anarchists
1903 births
1961 deaths
Secretaries General of the Confederación Nacional del Trabajo
Spanish booksellers
Spanish emigrants to Mexico